This is a list of universities in North Macedonia.

Public colleges 

  Goce Delčev University of Štip
  Ss. Cyril and Methodius University of Skopje
  Mother Teresa University in Skopje
  St. Clement of Ohrid University of Bitola
  State University of Tetova
  University of Information Science and Technology "St. Paul The Apostle"

Public-Private not-for-profit College 

  South East European University, Tetovo &  Skopje

Private universities and faculties

  Euro-Balkan University
  European University-North Macedonia
  FON University
 International Vision University 
  International Balkan University
International Slavic University G. R. Derzavin - Sveti Nikole and Bitola
  International University of Struga
  MIT University Skopje
  South East European University
  University American College Skopje
  University for Audiovisual Arts - European Film Academy ESRA - Skopje
  University of Studies Struga "EuroCollege"
  University of Tourism and Management in Skopje
 Faculty of Business Economy (FBE)   
 Euro College Kumanovo
 Integrated Business Institute (IBI)

References 

Universities
North Macedonia
North Macedonia